Nirmal Palazhi (born in Kozhikode, Kerala) is an Indian actor who has worked predominantly in the Malayalam film industry known for his work on Puthan Panam, Diwanji Moola Grand Prix  and Ira.

Personal life 
Nirmal was born and settled in Kozhikode, a north district of Kerala State. He married Mrs. Anju and they have two children.

Career 
He started his career as a mimicry stage artist part of the Calicut-based stage group, Calicut V4U, Nirmal performed at various shows and gained popularity after his appearance on the comedy reality show Comedy Festival, aired in Mazhavil Manorama. He then went on to make his big screen debut with the film Kuttiyum Kolum, following which he was featured in Salala Mobiles, North 24 Kaatham, Puthan Panam, and Onpatham Valavinappuram. His recent releases include Orayiram Kinakkalal, Angane Njanum Premichu, Ente Mezhuthiri Athazhangal, Kuttimama, Kakshi Amminippilla and Edakkad Battalion 06.

Filmography

Films 

 All films are in Malayalam, unless otherwise noted.

Television

Web series

References

External links 
 
 

People from Kozhikode district
Male actors in Malayalam cinema
Indian male film actors
Male actors from Kerala
Malayalam comedians
Indian male comedians
21st-century Indian male actors
Indian stand-up comedians
Living people
Year of birth missing (living people)